Dill (Anethum graveolens) is an annual herb.

Dill may also refer to:

People
 Dill (surname), a list of people with the surname
 Dill (footballer) (born 1974), Brazilian retired footballer Elpídio Barbosa Conceição
 Dill Faulkes (born 1944), British businessman and philanthropist
 Dill Jones (1923–1984), Welsh jazz pianist
 Dill., standard abbreviation for German botanist Johann Jacob Dillen Dillenius (1684–1747)

Places
 Dill Township, Ontario, Canada
 Dill (river), Germany
 Dill, Germany, a municipality in Rhineland-Palatinate
 Dill, Tennessee, United States, an unincorporated community
 Dill Creek, New York, United States

Other uses
 Dill (restaurant), the first restaurant in Iceland to be awarded a Michelin star (in 2017)
 Dill Records, a small record label
 Dill Railway, a railway in Germany
 Dill Harris, a fictional character in the novel To Kill a Mockingbird
 Dill Building, Boston, Massachusetts, United States, on the National Register of Historic Places
 Dill School, Cleburne County, Arkansas, United States, a former school on the National Register of Historic Places 
 "Dill", a Russian language offensive term for someone of Ukrainian descent

See also
 Dil (disambiguation)
 Dil Pickles, a cartoon character from Rugrats
 Dilli (disambiguation)